The Long-Range Engagement Weapon (LREW) is a US Air Force concept for a next-generation beyond visual range air-to-air missile. Concept images shows a large, two-stage missile launched from an internal weapons bay of an F-22. There have been some reports that the LREW is too big to fit in the F-22 or F-35 internal weapons bay and is suited for the F-15EX or B-21.  It is currently being developed by Raytheon. This program is separate from the AIM-260 JATM being developed by Lockheed Martin.

See also

References

Post–Cold War air-to-air missiles of the United States
Surface-to-air missiles of the United States